Miguel Suárez may refer to:
 Miguel Suárez (footballer)
 Miguel Suárez (weightlifter)
 Miguel Ángel Suárez, Puerto Rican actor